Jarjarāyā was a city of medieval Iraq, surrounded by a meander of the Tigris. Capital of the district of Lower Nahrawan, it was inhabited by Persian nobles, according to Ya'qubi. This has been taken to assume that Jarjaraya was founded in the Sasanian period, if not earlier. By the time of Yaqut al-Hamawi in the early 1200s, however, the town was in ruins. Archaeological evidence suggests that the site was abandoned by the end of the Abbasid period.

Several medieval viziers had origins here, as indicated in their nisbas. Two Abbasid viziers, Al-Abbas ibn al-Hasan al-Jarjara'i and Ahmad ibn al-Khasib al-Jarjara'i, were from Jarjaraya, as was the eleventh-century Fatimid vizier Abu'l-Qasim al-Jarjara'i, who held the position for 18 years.

References

Sources 
 
 
 
 Lev, Yaacov. "Army, Regime, and Society in Fatimid Egypt, 358-487/968-1094." International Journal of Middle East Studies 19, no. 3 (1987): 337-65. Accessed March 5, 2020. www.jstor.org/stable/163658.

Former populated places in Iraq